Ramla Municipal Stadium (Itztadion Ironi Ramla), officially known as Toto Stadium Ramla, is a football stadium in Ramla, Israel.

The stadium was renovated ahead of the 2015 UEFA Women's Under-19 Championship, in which the stadium hosted 3 matches.

References 

 

Beitar Tel Aviv Bat Yam F.C.
Sport in Ramla
Football venues in Israel
Sports venues in Central District (Israel)